WX Pyxidis is a cataclysmic variable star system in the constellation Pyxis. Its X-ray emissions were discovered in 1984, after which a visual correlate was searched for. It is classed as an intermediate polar system, composed of a white dwarf and red dwarf with a calculated spectral type of M2V in close orbit around each other and the spin of the degenerate star is such that it does not present the same face to the other star. The degenerate star spins on its axis every 25 minutes. The stars are estimated to take 5.3 hours to orbit each other and the system is 1530 parsecs distant.

References

Pyxis (constellation)
Pyxidis, WX
Intermediate polars